Orbital velocity may refer to the following:
 The orbital speed of a revolving body in a gravitational field.
 The velocity of particles due to wave motion, such as those in wind waves
 The equivalent velocity of a bound electron needed to produce its orbital kinetic energy